Bhavnagar District is a district of southeastern Gujarat, India, on the Saurashtra peninsula. It is also known as Gohilwar as a major portion of Bhavnagar district was ruled by Gohil Rajputs. The administrative headquarters is in the town of Bhavnagar.

Geography 

Bhavnagar District covers an area of over 8334 km2. The coastal area is mostly alluvium.

Bhavnagar borders with Ahmedabad District to the northeast, Botad District to the northwest, the Gulf of Cambay to the east and south and Amreli District to the west.

History 
Bhavnagar State was a salute state during the Raj, ruled by the Gohil Rajputs, .

Bhavnagar lost two talukas, Botad and Gadhada, to the creation in August 2013 of the new district of Botad.

Administrative divisions 
Bhavnagar District is divided into ten talukas : Bhavnagar, Sihor, Umrala, Gariadhar, Palitana, Mahuva, Talaja, Ghogha, Jesar and Vallbhipur.  There are close to 800 villages in this district, for example, Tana.

Demographics 

According to the 2011 census Bhavnagar district has a population of 2,880,365, roughly equal to the nation of Jamaica or the US state of Kansas. This gives it a ranking of 133rd in India (out of a total of 640). Its population growth rate over the decade 2001-2011 was 16.53%. Bhavnagar has a sex ratio of 931 females for every 1000 males, and a literacy rate of 76.84%.

The divided district has a population of 2,393,272, of which 676,189 (28.25%) lived in urban areas. Bhavnagar had a sex ratio of 930 females per 1000 males. Scheduled Castes and Scheduled Tribes are 125,441 (5.24%) and 8,039 (0.34%) of the population respectively.

Hindus were 2,176,962 while Muslims were 187,148 and Jains 21,851.

City and Towns 
The population development of the cities and towns in Bhavnagar.

Language

At the time of the 2011 census, 97.51% of the population spoke Gujarati and 1.18% Hindi as their first language.

Politics
  

|}

Sites

Historical places 
Among the many historical places in Bhavnagar District are:
Buddhist caves in Taleja,
Statues of Seven Sisters in Rauhishala, and
Gandhi Memorial and Sardar Memorial at Crescent Circle in the town of Bhavnagar.

Natural heritage sites 

Velavadar Blackbuck National Park is the only tropical grassland in India recognised as a National park. It is spread over an area of 34.08 km2. The park contains mainly blackbuck, antelopes, nilgai, wolves, jackals, hyenas, jungle cats, fox, and wild boar. Endangered birds such as Houbara Bustard, Lesser Florican, Sarus White Storks, White Pelican, Montagu, and Pallid harrier also call the park home. Raptors including the Greater Spotted Eagle, Juvenile Imperial Eagle, Bonelli's Eagle, Short-toed Snake Eagle, and Long-legged Buzzard are also seen in the park. The climate in Velavdar National Park makes it one of the best places for the migrating birds to breed.

Piram Island is an island approximately 6 km offshore off Ghogha. It is said that this island was created about 3.5 million years ago. It is well known for its diversity of life, including many vulnerable or endangered species. There is a ruined fort which was built in 1325. The island has mangrove vegetation and also nesting site for two endangered species of sea turtle; Olive ridley sea turtle and Green sea turtle, and around fifty species of birds, mostly seabirds.

Notes

references

External links 
 Official website
 Bhavnagar Regional Transport Office

 
Districts of Gujarat